The Mumbai women's cricket team is an Indian domestic cricket team representing the city of Mumbai. The team has represented the state in Women's Senior One Day Trophy (List A) and  Senior women's T20 league.

Current squad 
Current Mumbai squad. Players with international caps are listed in bold.

Honours
 Women's Senior One Day Trophy
 Runners-up (3): 2010–11, 2013–14, 2015–16

References

Women's cricket teams in India
Cricket in Mumbai